Jaume I (Spanish: Jaime I) or the Monument to James I is an instance of public art in Valencia, Spain. The monument is topped by an equestrian bronze statue representing James I of Aragon, conqueror of Valencia in 1238 and founder of the Kingdom of Valencia.

History and description 
The project for the monument was lobbied in 1875 by a group of people associated to Las Provincias, on the occasion of the upcoming 600th anniversary of the death of James I in 1276, and then assumed by the Ayuntamiento, setting a managing junta for the project.

Entrusted to the municipal architect Constantino Marzo, works in the 7.5 m high pedestal took place in 1878. In October 1882 the design of the equestrian statue was awarded to the Vallmitjana brothers from Barcelona, Venancio and Agapito, although the former renounced, leaving only Agapito. The wood model of the statue was delivered in 1886, and moved from Barcelona to Valencia in pieces. The bronze employed for the 5.20 m high statue, was obtained from unused cannons from the Castle of Peñíscola provided by the Ministry of War. The monument was unveiled on 20 July 1891.

Year 1891").

References 
Citations

Bibliography
 
 
 

Bronze sculptures in Spain
Outdoor sculptures in Spain
Sculptures of men in Spain
Buildings and structures in Valencia
Monuments and memorials in Spain
Statues of monarchs
Equestrian statues in Spain